The 1997–98 Divizia B was the 58th season of the second tier of the Romanian football league system.

The format has been maintained to two series, each of them having 18 teams. At the end of the season, the winners of the series promoted to Divizia A and the last three places from both series relegated to Divizia C. A promotion play-off was played between the runners-up of the series to decide the third team that promoted to Divizia A.

Team changes

To Divizia B
Promoted from Divizia C
 Nitramonia Făgăraș
 Midia Năvodari
 Vega Deva
 UM Timișoara

Relegated from Divizia A
 Politehnica Timișoara
 Brașov

From Divizia B
Relegated to Divizia C
 Cetatea Târgu Neamț
 Minaur Zlatna
 Steaua Mizil
 CFR Timișoara

Promoted to Divizia A
 Foresta Fălticeni
 CSM Reșița

Renamed teams
Danubiana Ploiești was renamed as Astra Ploiești.

Bucovina Suceava merged with Foresta Fălticeni, became the second squad of Foresta and was renamed as Foresta II Fălticeni.

League tables

Seria I

Seria II

Promotion play-off
The 2nd-placed teams of the Divizia B played a match to decide the third team promoted to Divizia A. The match was played on neutral ground, on the Nitramonia Stadium in Făgăraș, Brașov County.

Top scorers 
16 goals
  Daniel Bona (Precizia Săcele)

14 goals
  Daniel Costescu (Poiana Câmpina)

9 goals
  Ionuț Savu  (Rocar București)

7 goals

  Ionuț Badea (Dacia Pitești)
  Gigi Gorga  (Metrom Brașov)
  Mugurel Buga (FC Brașov)

6 goals

  Cristian Dicu (Midia Năvodari)
  Marius Păcurar (Corvinul Hunedoara)

5 goals

  Ciprian Danciu (Baia Mare)
  Mihai Ilie (ARO Câmpulung)
  Ionuț Bădescu (ARO Câmpulung)
  Marius Diță (Dacia Pitești)
  Tihamer Török (Nitramonia Făgăraș)
  Eusebiu Tudor (Midia Năvodari)
  Mircea Oprea  (Apulum Alba Iulia)

See also 

1997–98 Divizia A

References 

Liga II seasons
Rom
2